Brevidentavis (meaning "short-toothed bird") is a genus of ornithuromorph bird from the Early Cretaceous (Aptian) Xiagou Formation of Gansu Province, China. The genus contains a single species, Brevidentavis zhangi, known from a specimen including a partial skull and cervical vertebrae. The Brevidentavis holotype shows unusually blunt teeth in its lower jaw, which the describing authors suggest may indicate a specialized diet. Its dentition shows similarities with those of hesperornitheans, and indeed it may be an early member of that group.

Naming 
The generic name, "Brevidentavis," combines the Latin “brevis,” meaning “short,” “dent,” meaning “tooth,” and “avis,” meaning “bird.” The specific name, "zhangi," honors Zhang Xing, who was involved in the expedition where the holotype fossil was discovered. Its description also uses the name Brachydontornis, which means the same except the roots are in Greek.

References 

Birds described in 2021
Fossil taxa described in 2021
Extinct birds of Asia
Early Cretaceous dinosaurs of Asia
Prehistoric bird genera
Prehistoric euornitheans